Gary Trevisiol (born 15 November 1959) is a Canadian former cyclist. He competed in the individual pursuit and points race events at the 1984 Summer Olympics.

References

External links
 

1959 births
Living people
Canadian male cyclists
Olympic cyclists of Canada
Cyclists at the 1984 Summer Olympics
Sportspeople from Greater Sudbury